Tobias Holmberg (born 11 May 1987) is a Swedish Bandy player who currently plays for Västerås SK as a midfielder.  Tobias is a youth product of Västerås SK where he has remained through his career so far.  Tobias made his first team debut in the 2003-2004 season.  Tobias was a member of the Sweden U19 World Championship team and scored seven goals in the tournament.

External links
Tobias Holmberg at Bandysidan
Västerås SK

Swedish bandy players
Living people
1987 births
Västerås SK Bandy players
SKA-Neftyanik players
Expatriate bandy players in Russia